The 2017 Chinese Artistic Gymnastics Championships were held from 5 May to 9 May 2017 in Wuhan, China.

Women's Medalists

References

Chinese Artistic Gymnastics Championships
2017 in Chinese sport
Chinese Artistic Gymnastics Championships